Hauts-Plateaux is a department of West Province in Cameroon. The department covers an area of 415 km and as of 2005 had a total population of 80,678. The capital of the department lies at Baham. The department was created in 1995 when the Mifi department was split up.

Subdivisions
The department is divided administratively into 4 communes and in turn into villages.

Communes 
 Baham
 Bamendjou
 Bangou
 Batié

References

Departments of Cameroon
West Region (Cameroon)